Katharine Drexel, SBS (born Catherine Mary Drexel; November 26, 1858 – March 3, 1955) was an American heiress, philanthropist, religious sister, educator, and foundress of the Sisters of the Blessed Sacrament. She was the second person born in what is now the United States to be canonized as a saint and the first one born a U.S. citizen.

Early life
Katharine Mary Drexel was born Catherine Marie Drexel in Philadelphia, Pennsylvania, on November 26, 1858, to Francis Anthony Drexel and Hannah Langstroth. She had an older sister, Elizabeth. Her family owned a considerable banking fortune, and her uncle Anthony Joseph Drexel was the founder of Drexel University in Philadelphia. She was a distant cousin of former first lady Jacqueline Kennedy Onassis on her father's side. 

Langstroth died five weeks after Katherine's birth and Anthony Joseph and his wife Ellen cared for Katherine and Elizabeth for the next two years. Her father married Emma Bouvier in 1860, brought his older children home, and had a third daughter, Louise, in 1863. 

The girls grew up in a wealthy and religious household with charitable principles. Emma would regularly distribute food and clothing at her home to people. 

The family lived on a 90-acre estate in Torresdale named St. Michel in honor of St. Michael the Archangel. Rev. James O'Connor was pastor of St. Dominic's in nearby Holmesburg, Philadelphia and served as chaplain to the Society of the Sacred Heart at their motherhouse at Eden Hall in Torresdale where Katherine's maternal aunt was mother superior. In 1876, he was appointed vicar apostolic of Nebraska, an area that covered Nebraska, northeastern Colorado, Wyoming, and parts of Utah, Montana and the Dakotas. He was consecrated titular Bishop of Dibona at the chapel at Eden Hall. Katherine was awakened to the plight of indigenous American people during a family trip to the Western United States.

Religious work 
Drexel decided to establish a religious congregation to address the needs of Native Americans and African-Americans in the southern, western and southwestern United States. Having completed her postulancy with the Sisters of Mercy in Pittsburg, in February 1891 she founded the Sisters of the Blessed Sacrament. She also financed more than 60 missions and schools around the United States, as well as founding Xavier University of Louisiana – the only historically Black and Catholic university in the United States.

Sainthood
Drexel is one of only a few American saints and the second American-born saint (Elizabeth Ann Seton was a natural-born US citizen, born in New York City in 1774 and canonized in 1975). 

Drexel was beatified by Pope John Paul II on November 20, 1988, when her first miracle through prayer—healing the severe ear infection of teenage Robert Gutherman in 1974—was accepted. She was canonized on October 1, 2000, when her 1994 miracle of reversing congenital deafness in 2-year old Amy Wall was recognized.  

The Vatican cited a fourfold legacy of Drexel: 
 A love of the Eucharist and perspective on the unity of all peoples;
 courage and initiative in addressing social inequality among minorities; 
 her efforts to achieve quality education for all; 
 and selfless service, including the donation of her inheritance, for the victims of injustice. (She is known as the patron saint of racial justice and of philanthropists.

Her feast day is observed on March 3, the anniversary of her death. She is buried in Cornwells Heights, Bensalem Township, Pennsylvania.

The "Saint Katharine Drexel Mission Center and National Shrine" was formerly located at St. Elizabeth's Convent in Bensalem, Pennsylvania. The Mission Center offered retreat programs, historic site tours, days of prayer, presentations about Saint Katharine Drexel, as well as lectures and seminars related to her legacy. The convent was subsequently sold and in August, 2018, Drexel's remains were transferred to a new shrine at the.Cathedral Basilica of Saints Peter and Paul in Philadelphia.

A second-class relic of Drexel can be found inside the altar of the Mary chapel at St. Raphael the Archangel Catholic Church in Raleigh, North Carolina, and in the Day Chapel of Saint Katharine Drexel Parish in Sugar Grove, Illinois.

Namesakes

Numerous Catholic parishes, schools, and churches bear the name of St. Katharine Drexel.

Parishes 
 St. Katharine Drexel Parish of Maple, North Carolina
 St. Katharine Drexel Parish of Ione, California
 St. Katharine Drexel Parish of Martell, California 
 St. Katharine Drexel Parish of Cape Coral, Florida
 St. Katharine Drexel Parish of Venice, Florida
 St. Katharine Drexel Parish of Weston, Florida
 St. Katharine Drexel Mission of Trenton, Georgia
 St. Katharine Drexel Parish of Cascade, Idaho
 St. Katharine Drexel Parish of Springfield, Illinois
 St. Katharine Drexel Parish of Sugar Grove, Illinois
 St. Katharine Drexel Parish of Frederick, Maryland
 St. Katharine Drexel Parish of Roxbury, Massachusetts
 St. Katharine Drexel Parish of Ramsey, Minnesota 
 St. Katharine Drexel Parish of Alton, New Hampshire
 St. Katharine Drexel Parish of Burlington, New Jersey
 St. Katharine Drexel Parish of Egg Harbor Township, New Jersey
 St. Katharine Drexel Parish of Buffalo, New York
 St. Katharine Drexel Parish of Bentleyville, Pennsylvania
 St. Katharine Drexel Parish of Chester, Pennsylvania
 St. Katharine Drexel Parish of Lansford, Pennsylvania
 St. Katharine Drexel Parish of Mechanicsburg, Pennsylvania
 St. Katharine Drexel Parish of Pleasant Mount, Pennsylvania
 St. Katharine Drexel Parish of Sioux Falls, South Dakota
 St. Katharine Drexel Parish of Hempstead, Texas
 St. Katharine Drexel Parish of Beaver Dam, Wisconsin
 St. Katharine Drexel Parish of Kaukauna, Wisconsin
 St. Katharine Drexel Parish of New Orleans, f/k/a Holy Ghost Parish
 St. Joseph's Shrine of St. Katharine Drexel, Columbia, Virginia
 St. Katharine Drexel Mission of Haymarket, Virginia
 Our Lady of the Assumption Catholic Church's shrine of St. Katharine Drexel, Carencro, Louisiana

Schools 
Schools St. Katharine Drexel founded or funded include (but are not limited to):

 Xavier University of Louisiana
 St. Benedict the Moor School
Blessed Sacrament Catholic School, Beaumont, Texas
 Sacred Heart Catholic School, Port Arthur, Texas. 
 St. Joseph Indian Normal School, now called Drexel Hall, on the campus of St. Joseph's College, Rensselaer, Indiana. The Indian Normal School operated from 1888 to 1896. A school for boys, the Federal Indian Boarding School Initiative indicates children were "taken" from reservations in order to matriculate here. See page 350 of cited source.
 St. Michael Indian School, serving grades K–12 in St. Michaels, Arizona
 St. Mark School, the first in New York City for African-American Catholic children
 Our Lady of Lourdes Catholic Church and School, Founded 1912, Atlanta, Georgia
 St. Vincent De Paul Catholic Church and School, Founded 1932, Nashville, Tennessee 
 St. Ignatius of Loyola Parish was founded in 1893. St. Katharine Drexel and the Sisters of the Blessed Sacrament opened St. Ignatius of Loyola School in 1926. The school moved to its current facility in 1967 in Philadelphia. 
 St. Emma's Industrial and Agricultural Institute (later St. Emma Military Academy for Boys) founded on the Belmead Plantation near Powhatan, Virginia in 1897
 St. Frances de Sales School for Girls founded on the Belmead Plantation near Powhatan, Virginia in 1899
 St. Peter Claver Catholic School in Macon, Georgia, in 1913 with the help of Bishop Benjamin Kiely and Father Ignatius Lissner.
 Kate Drexel Industrial Boarding School, on the Umatilla Reservation in Pendleton, Oregon. Operated from 1847 to least as late as 1929. See page 185 of cited source.
 St. John's School for Osage Indian Boys, Blackburn, Oklahoma. Operated from 1888 to 1913, reportedly at the request of the Osage Nation. See page 347 of cited source.
 St. Mary's Indian Industrial School, on the Turtle Mountain Reservation in Belcourt, North Dakota. Operated from 1884 to 1910.  See page 359 of cited source.

Schools named in her honor include:

 Katharine Drexel Elementary School of Broussard, Louisiana 
 St. Katharine Drexel School of St. Cloud and Sauk Rapids, Minnesota 
 St. Katharine Drexel School of St. Louis 
 St. Katharine Drexel School of Philadelphia
 St. Katharine Drexel School of Sioux Falls, South Dakota
 St. Katharine Drexel School of Beaver Dam, Wisconsin
 St. Katharine Drexel Regional Catholic School of Holland, Pennsylvania
 St. Katharine Drexel Preparatory High School New Orleans
 St. Katharine Drexel School of Wichita, Kansas
 St. Katharine Drexel Adult Learning Center – Catholic Charities of Tulsa, Oklahoma
 St. Katharine Drexel Preparatory – Catholic Diocese of Richmond, Virginia
 St. Katharine Drexel School (previously St. Germaine School) of Pittsburgh
 St. Katharine Drexel Academy in San Diego, California
 St. Edward School New Iberia, Louisiana

Churches and chapels 
 Katharine-Drexel Kapelle, Dornbirn, Austria—the birthplace of Drexel's grandfather Francis Martin Drexel
 St. Katharine Drexel Chapel and Retirement Center, El Reno, Oklahoma
 St. Katharine Drexel Catholic Church, New Orleans 
 St. Katharine Drexel Catholic Mission, Maple, North Carolina
St. Katharine Drexel Catholic Church, Martell, California
 St. Katharine Drexel Summer Chapel, Harpswell, Maine 
 St. Katharine Drexel Chapel Drexel university campus Philadelphia, PA
 St. Katharine Drexel Chapel (on the campus of Xavier University of Louisiana, New Orleans)
The choir loft window in the Chapel of Our Lady of the Sioux, Saint Joseph's Indian School, Chamberlain, South Dakota, was donated by the Drexel Family.

Streets 
 Drexel Road, Tucson, Arizona
 Drexel Drive, New Orleans, LA
Drexel Avenue, Oak Creek, Milwaukee County, Wisconsin. (Drexel Towne Centre, Oak Creek, Milwaukee County, Wisconsin.)

Other 
 The St. Katharine Drexel Region of the Secular Franciscan Order
 Katharine Drexel library located on Knights Road in Philadelphia, PA.

See also 

 Saint Katharine Drexel, patron saint archive
 Sisters of the Blessed Sacrament
 Xavier University of Louisiana

References

Further reading
 Tarry, Ellen (1958). St. Katharine Drexel: Friend of the Oppressed. New York: Farrar, Straus and Cudahy, Inc.
  - By a contributing writer.

External links 
 Sisters of the Blessed Sacrament Website
 
 Recipient of the Saint Katharine Drexel medal: Sr. Sandra Smithson, aka Sr. Maria Crucis, OSF, March 3, 2011.
 Bio from St. Katharine Drexel Mission
 David Leighton, "Street Smarts: Generous nun the namesake for Drexel Road," Arizona Daily Star, March 4, 2014
 "St. Katharine Drexel", Sisters Of The Blessed Sacrament

1858 births
1955 deaths
20th-century Christian saints
American people of Austrian descent
19th-century American Roman Catholic nuns
American Roman Catholic saints
Katharine
Educators from Philadelphia
American women educators
Founders of Catholic religious communities
Christian female saints of the Late Modern era
Beatifications by Pope John Paul II
Canonizations by Pope John Paul II
Venerated Catholics by Pope John Paul II
Bensalem Township, Pennsylvania
Xavier University of Louisiana
Catholics from Pennsylvania
African-American Roman Catholicism
Sisters of the Blessed Sacrament
Roman Catholic missionaries in the United States
Roman Catholic activists
20th-century American Roman Catholic nuns